Walibi Rhône-Alpes is a French theme park located in the commune of Les Avenières, in the Isère department. It is the largest theme park of the Rhône-Alpes region. The park contains more than 33 rides and it covers an area of 35 hectares. Origin of the first Walibi park, the park was created in 1975 by Eddy Meeùs, a Belgian businessman. The name "Walibi" comes from the three municipalities in which the Walibi Belgium park is located: Wavre, Limal and Bierges.

The park had an income of 8.8 million euros in 2005, and it greets over 400,000 visitors yearly.

Walibi Rhône-Alpes also contains a 13,000 m2 waterpark called L'Île aux Pirates (previously Aqualibi).

As of 2006, the park is owned and operated by Compagnie des Alpes, which also owns many theme parks and ski resorts across Europe.

History

The park opened in 1979 under the name Avenir Land. The Walibi group would acquire the park in 1989, renaming it Walibi Rhône-Alpes.

In 1986, Walibi introduced water rides with the creation of a waterpark called Aqualibi. It would be given a makeover in 2006, becoming L'Île aux Pirates (French for Pirates' Island), and featuring a Caribbean theme.

Sale to Six Flags
In 1998, the park would change hands once again and it became part of the Six Flags chain, as part of the American company's international expansion.

Sale to Star Parks
However, six years later, in 2004, Six Flags sold most of its European parks (including Walibi Rhône-Alpes) to Star Parks. The exception was Warner Bros. Movie World Madrid, which was sold back to Time Warner and renamed Warner Bros. Park and later Parque Warner Madrid in 2006. The Walibi parks would be transferred to Compagnie des Alpes the following year, and they've belonged to the French company ever since.

Like its sister parks in Belgium and Holland, it began to go down a more themed route in the 2010's. Despite being a smaller park, the park still received regular investments including 2 roller coasters, Timber (anchoring a farm-themed area) and Mystic (anchoring a horror retheme of the front right of the park). The water park closed with the park after the 2019 season and will be replaced by Exotic Land for the 2022 season.

Rides and attractions

Coasters

Timber - The Gravity Group - Wooden roller coaster - 2016
Generator - Vekoma Boomerang roller coaster
Woodstock Express - Zamperla Wild Mouse roller coaster (formerly Zig Zag and later Scratch)
La Coccinelle - Zierer junior steel roller coaster
Mystic - Gerstlauer Infinity Coaster - 2019

Thrill rides

Le Galion - Swinging pirate ship
Skunx Tower - Drop tower
Stock Car - Bumper cars
Tomahawk - Chance Rides Inverter
Airboat - Zamperla NebulaZ

Family rides

Surf Music - Family water slide
Bamba - Calypso ride with 16 two-passenger gondolas
Le Grand Soleil - Ferris wheel
Carrousel - Merry-go-round
Melody Road - Car ride
Mini Ferme - Small area where guests can interact with different farm animals
Radja River - River rapids ride
Tam Tam Tour - Relaxing tow boat ride in a jungle decor
Wab Tour - Miniature railway ride

Children's rides

La Chevauchée
On Air
Be Bop
Qwads
Wab Band Tour

See also

Compagnie des Alpes
Walibi Holland
Walibi Belgium

References

External links
Official website
RCDB's information on Walibi Rhône-Alpes

Amusement parks in France
Compagnie des Alpes
Former Six Flags theme parks
Buildings and structures in Isère
Tourist attractions in Auvergne-Rhône-Alpes
1979 establishments in France
Amusement parks opened in 1979